Lombardsijde, also Lombartzyde, is a district in the Belgian municipality of Middelkerke in West Flanders province, in northwestern Belgium near Nieuwpoort.

Fighting occurred in and around Lombardsijde during World War I.

Notes

References
 Merriam-Webster's Geographic Dictionary, Third Edition. Springfield, Massachusetts: Merriam-Webster, Inc., 1997. .

Populated places in West Flanders
Sub-municipalities of Middelkerke